The Islander 24 is an American sailboat that was designed by Joseph McGlasson and first built in 1961.

The Islander 24 is a fiberglass development of the wooden-hulled Catalina Islander. The design was developed into the Islander 24 Bahama in 1964.

Development
McGlasson approached Glas Laminates to build a version of his wooden Catalina Islander in fiberglass. The mold was created by using the hull of one of the wooden boats and the resulting fiberglass boats retained the distinctive wooden board imprints from the mold. The Islander 24 features a trunk cabin, but the raised deck Islander 24 Bahama version proved a bigger commercial success and the Islander 24 had a relatively short production run.

Production
The design was built by McGlasson Marine/Islander Yachts in the United States from 1961 to 1967, but it is now out of production.

Design
The Islander 24 is a recreational keelboat, built predominantly of fiberglass, with wood trim. It has a masthead sloop rig, a spooned raked stem, a raised transom, a keel-mounted rudder controlled by a tiller and a fixed fin keel. It displaces  and carries  of lead ballast.

See also
List of sailing boat types

Similar sailboats
Achilles 24
Atlantic City catboat
Balboa 24
C&C 24
Challenger 24
Columbia 24
Dana 24
MacGregor 24
Mirage 24
Nutmeg 24
San Juan 24
Seidelmann 245
Shark 24
Tonic 23

References

Keelboats
1960s sailboat type designs
Sailing yachts
Sailboat type designs by Joseph McGlasson
Sailboat types built by Islander Yachts